Bichiș is a commune in Mureș County, Transylvania, Romania. It is composed of four villages: Bichiș, Gâmbuț (Gombostelke), Nandra (Lándor) and Ozd (Magyarózd). Its population was 1,039 at the 2002 census, and 805 at the 2011 census.

See also
List of Hungarian exonyms (Mureș County)

References

Communes in Mureș County
Localities in Transylvania